St Martin's School is an Anglican private co-educational school in Rosettenville, Johannesburg, South Africa.

History 

St. Martin’s School traces its origins back to the foundation of St. Agnes School for the training of domestic helpers in 1908. A few years later in 1911, St. Peter’s Priory and College were added, offering a boarding-based high school education to the young men who came from all over South Africa. The College was run by the Anglican Order of the Community of the Resurrection. Trevor Huddleston, one of the priests of the community was based at St Peter's for a number of years, and it was he who gave Hugh Masekela his first trumpet.

St. Peter's College soon became known as the "Black Eton" where academic achievements were espoused. The list of the early alumni includes Oliver Tambo, Fikile Bam and Masekela.

The apartheid policies of the National Party regime, specifically the Bantu Education Act put pressure on the school and it was closed in 1956. However, the Anglican Church ensured that education continued and the school reopened in 1958 as St. Martin's School.

Founded as a boys' school, St Martin's became the established Anglican Diocesan School for the south of Johannesburg. In 1978, the school became a co-educational institution.

A Preparatory School was opened in 1971, and is situated on a picturesque campus in The Hill, overlooking Moffat Park.

Since the multiplication of the Anglican Diocese of Johannesburg in 1990, the school has been the Diocesan School for the Diocese of Christ the King. The bishop of the diocese is the visitor to the School.

The school celebrated its Diamond Jubilee in 2018.

Headmasters
Michael Stern, OBE (1958 – 1962)
Michael de Lisle (1963–1972)
Oliver Wigmore (1973–1983)
Peter Vieyra (1983–1990)
James Welsh (1990–2017)
Thomas Hagspihl (2018–2022)

Heads of St Martin's Preparatory School
Mrs P. H. Bestelink (1971–1983) Founding Headmistress
Mr F. G. Keon (1975–1985) (Senior Prep School)
Mrs R. Y. McAlister (1984–1985) (Junior Prep School)
Mr G. M. Greenway (1986–1996)
Mr B. E. Crouser (1997–1999)
Mr L. Jacobs (2000–2001)
Mr D. I. Maritz (2002–2012)
The Revd M. M. Chalmers (2012–2019)
Mrs M. Myburgh (2019-2022)

Visitors to the School
The bishop of Johannesburg was the visitor to the school until 1990, and these were:
Rt Revd Ambrose Reeves (1958 - 1961)
Rt Revd Leslie Stradling (1961 - 1974)
Rt Revd Timothy Bavin (1974 - 1985)
Most Revd Desmond Tutu (1985 - 1986)
Rt Revd Duncan Buchanan (1986 - 1990)

From 1990 onwards the visitor to the school is the bishop of the Diocese of Christ the King.
Rt Revd Peter Lee (1990 - 2016)
Rt Revd William Mostert (2017 - present)

Notable alumni 

 Wayne Ferreira
 Peter Hatendi
 Peter Klatzow
 Hugh Masekela
 Richard Masemola
 Es'kia Mphahlele
 Tony Peake
 Oliver Tambo

Notable staff

Trevor Huddleston
Rowan Smith
Michael Stern, OBE
Jeremy Taylor (singer)

Notes and references

External links 

 

Anglican schools in South Africa
Boarding schools in South Africa
Schools in Johannesburg
Private schools in Gauteng
Educational institutions established in 1958
People educated at St Peter’s College, Rosettenville
1958 establishments in South Africa